The Buckingham Training School is a historic school property at 245 Camden Street in Dillwyn, Virginia.  Now Ellis Acres Memorial Park, the property's centerpiece is a community center that was built in 1932 as the automotive shop building of the local Rosenwald School. The building was one of 11 such facilities built with Rosenwald funds in Virginia, and one of about 160 nationwide.  It is a modest single-story wood-frame structure with a concrete block foundation and weatherboard siding.  Its interior has retained many original features despite standing vacant and the undergoing rehabilitation for use as a community center.

The property was listed on the National Register of Historic Places in 2015.

See also
National Register of Historic Places listings in Buckingham County, Virginia

References

School buildings on the National Register of Historic Places in Virginia
Buildings and structures in Buckingham County, Virginia
National Register of Historic Places in Buckingham County, Virginia
School buildings completed in 1932
1932 establishments in Virginia